Archilema is a genus of moths in the subfamily Arctiinae. The genus was erected by Sven Jorgen R. Birket-Smith in 1965.

Species
 Archilema cinderella (Kiriakoff, 1958)
 Archilema dentata Kühne, 2007
 Archilema modiolus (Kiriakoff, 1958)
 Archilema nivea Kühne, 2007
 Archilema subumbrata (Holland, 1893)
 Archilema uelleburgensis (Strand, 1912)
 Archilema vilis Birket-Smith, 1965

Former species
 Archilema achrosis
 Archilema lucens Durante & Panzera, 2002 is now a synonym of Pusiola poliosia (Kiriakoff, 1958)

References

Kühne, L. (2007). Esperiana Buchreihe zur Entomologie. Memoir 3: 353–394.

Lithosiini
Moth genera